Marquis Lì of Cai (蔡厲侯) (died 863 BC), ancestral name Ji (姬), given name unknown, was the fifth ruler of the State of Cai.  He was the only known son of Marquis Gōng of Cai. He was succeeded by his son.

References
Shiji
Chinese Wikipedia

9th-century BC Chinese monarchs
Zhou dynasty nobility
Cai (state)
863 BC deaths
Year of birth unknown